K. Kunjunni Raja (February 26, 1920 – May 30, 2005) was an Indian writer and scholar in Kerala.

Biography
He was born in February 1920 in Nadathara in Thrissur district in Kerala.  After his schooling at St. Thomas H.S. Thrissur  he joined St. Thomas college there for higher studies. He had his further studies  at Presidency College, Madras, Madras University and London School of Oriental Studies from where he received an  M.A and two PhDs.  He joined as lecturer at Govt. College, Chittoor, worked in various government colleges and then in 1951 joined Department of Sanskrit, Chennai University. After retirement  worked as honorary director of Adayar library. He has also functioned as a member of Central Film Censor Board and in the advisory council of Kendra Sahitya Academy.  He knew more than five languages including Prakrit and German.  He has to his credit 30 books and more than 150 articles in Malayalam and English. He died in May 2005 at the age of 85.

Works
 Malayalam
 Londonil
 Bhasha chinthakal
 BhashaGaveshanam
 English 
Indian Theories of Meaning
Contribution of Kerala to Sanskrit Literature

References

1920 births
2005 deaths
Indian Sanskrit scholars
Malayalam-language writers
People from Thrissur district
Presidency College, Chennai alumni
Writers from Kerala
Indian expatriates in the United Kingdom